Fletcher Chapel, also known as Church of God and the Saints of Christ Church, is a historic chapel located in Northwest, Washington, D.C.

It was built in 1854 by the McKendree Methodist Episcopal Church to start a new congregation known as  Fletcher Chapel Methodist Episcopal Church. The building was purchased by the Church of God and the Saints of Christ Church in 1904 and added to the National Register of Historic Places in 1997.

References

Chapels in Washington, D.C.
Properties of religious function on the National Register of Historic Places in Washington, D.C.
Georgian architecture in Washington, D.C.
Churches completed in 1854
19th-century churches in the United States
1854 establishments in Washington, D.C.